The Royal Regiment might refer to
 The Duke of Edinburgh's Royal Regiment (Berkshire and Wiltshire)
 The King's Royal Regiment of New York
 The Princess of Wales's Royal Regiment
 The Régiment Royal
 The Royal 22e Régiment
 The Royal Australian Regiment
 The Royal Regiment of Artillery
 The Royal Regiment of Australian Artillery
 The Royal Regiment of Canada
 The Royal Regiment of Canadian Artillery
 The Royal Regiment of Fusiliers
 The Royal Regiment of New Zealand Artillery
 The Royal Regiment of Scotland
 The Royal Regiment of Wales
 The Royal Regiment (The Royal Scots)